Brian James Barnes (23 March 1933 – 9 May 2017) was a Roman Catholic archbishop.

Born in Australia, Barnes was ordained to the priesthood in 1958. He served as bishop of the Roman Catholic Diocese of Aitape, Papua New Guinea from 1987 to 1997. He then served as archbishop of the Roman Catholic Archdiocese of Port Moresby from 1997 to 2008.

Notes

1933 births
2017 deaths
20th-century Roman Catholic archbishops in Papua New Guinea
Knights Commander of the Order of the British Empire
Roman Catholic archbishops of Port Moresby
21st-century Roman Catholic archbishops in Papua New Guinea
Roman Catholic bishops of Aitape
Australian expatriates in Papua New Guinea
Australian Roman Catholic bishops